Lonergan's Discovery of the Science of Economics is a 2010 book by Michael Shute, in which the author provides an account of Bernard Lonergan's solution to a fundamental problem in economic theory.

References

External links
Lonergan's Discovery of the Science of Economics

2010 non-fiction books
Books about philosophy of economics
Works about Bernard Lonergan
University of Toronto Press books